First United Methodist Church is located in downtown Des Moines, Iowa, United States. It has been listed on the National Register of Historic Places since 1984 as First Methodist Episcopal Church, which is its original name.

History
The congregation was organized through a series of Bible Study meetings that were held in Rathburn Cabin in 1845. Early church services were also held in cabins in the early years. The first church building for the congregation was constructed in 1848 on Fifth Street, south of Walnut, and a larger brick structure was built on the same site in 1856. Four years later the congregation lost ownership of the building and had to rent the basement of the building for three years while the main sanctuary was used as a public hall for concerts, lectures, and the like. Centenary Methodist Episcopal Church and First Church merged in 1880, leaving First as the only downtown Methodist congregation. The congregation dedicated a new church on Ninth Street in 1881.

By 1906 the congregation numbered a thousand members even after it had founded 11 other Methodist congregations in the city. The groundbreaking for the present church was begun in 1905, and the cornerstone was laid during a ceremony on July 21, 1906. The church building was dedicated on June 14, 1908. A major restoration of the building was completed in 1940 with a new chancel and altar, rose window, a new pew arrangement, and a renewal of the pipe organ. The education wing was built in 1954. A new Reuter organ was added in 1962-1963 as was the marble backdrop and the Celtic Cross. In 1980 a historical mural was dedicated in the west balcony. The dome and the sanctuary were renovated in 2007.

The congregation went through two name changes in its history. In 1939 it became First Methodist after the Methodist Episcopal Church, Methodist Episcopal Church, South, and the Methodist Protestant Church merged to form the Methodist Church. In 1968 another change to First United Methodist Church occurred when the Methodist Church merged with the Evangelical United Brethren Church.

Architecture
The congregation hired the prominent Des Moines architectural firm of Proudfoot & Bird to design the present church. Because the estimated cost of $175,000 was too high, some of the decorative details of the planned church were not executed. The Neoclassical-style building features a symmetrical plan in monumental proportions, a large pedimented portico supported by Ionic columns, plain exterior surfaces of Bedford stone, and a Roman glass and copper dome that is capped by a Latin cross. The building's proportions are said to match those of the Pantheon in Rome.

Pipe organ
The church's pipe organ is Reuter Organ Company Opus 1412 installed in 1963. It is located in chambers on the sides of the sanctuary with no visible pipes. The instrument has a traditional style console in a fixed position, and it has a roll top.  It features electro-pneumatic chests, three manuals, four divisions, 62 stops, 50 registers, 62 ranks, and 3,435 pipes. The manual compass is 61 notes, while the pedal compass is 32 notes. The drawknobs are in vertical rows on angled jambs.  The balanced swell shoes/pedals are standard AGO placement. Rounding out the features are adjustable combination pistons, AGO Standard (concave radiating) pedalboard, reversible full organ/tutti thumb piston, reversible full organ/tutti toe stud, combination action toe studs, coupler reversible thumb pistons, and coupler reversible toe studs.

Stop list:

GREAT
 16' Sub Principal   61
 8' Principal       61
  8' Bourdon         61                            
 4' Octave          61
 4' Spillflöte      61
 2' Fifteenth       61
 IV  Fourniture     244
 III  Scharf         183
 16' Dulzian         PO 
 8' Trumpet         61
 Sub
 Unison off
 Super
 8' Fanfare Trumpet 61 a
 Chimes                       
                           
POSITIV
 8' Copula          61
 8' Salicional      61 b
 8' Flauto Dolce    61 b
 8' Flute Celeste   54 b
 4' Principal       61
 4' Koppelflöte     61         
 4' Cor de Nuit     61 b
 2' Principal       61
 1⅓' Larigot        61
 1' Sifflöte        61
III  Cymbale        183
 16' Dulzian        61
 8' Krummhorn       61
 8' Baryton         61 b
 4' Regal           61
 Tremolo
 Unison Off
 16' Fanfare Trumpet tc
 8' Fanfare Trumpet GT
 4' Fanfare Trumpet GT

SWELL
16' Sub Principal   61
 8' Principal       61
 8' Bourdon         61                    
 4' Octave          61
 4' Spillflöte      61
 2' Fifteenth       61
IV  Fourniture     244
III  Scharf        183
16' Dulzian         PO
 8' Trumpet         61
 Sub
 Unison off
 Super
 8' Fanfare Trumpet 61 a
 Chimes

PEDAL
32' Acoustic Bourdon --
16' Principal        32
16' Bourdon          32
16' Sub Principal    GT
 16' Lieblichbordun   SW
  8' Octave           32
  8' Gedeckt          32
  8' Sub Principal    GT
  8' Flauto Dolce     SW
  4' Choralbass       32
  4' Coppel           32
  2' Waldflöte        32
 II  Sesquialter      64
III  Mixtur           96
 16' Bombarde         32
 16' Dulzian          PO
  8' Bombarde         12
  8' Dulzian          PO
  4' Schalmei         32
  4' Dulzian          PO

Charity work
In 1992, First United Methodist Church joined with seven other churches in the Des Moines area and created the Churches United Shelter (now the Central Iowa Shelter), to combat homelessness in the area.

References

External links

 Church Website

Religious organizations established in 1845
Churches completed in 1908
United Methodist churches in Iowa
Neoclassical architecture in Iowa
Churches in Des Moines, Iowa
Churches on the National Register of Historic Places in Iowa
National Register of Historic Places in Des Moines, Iowa
1845 establishments in Iowa Territory
Neoclassical church buildings in the United States